Gladstone Mansfield Ferrie (21 November 1892 – 4 July 1955) was a Liberal party member of the House of Commons of Canada. He was born in Denver, Colorado, United States and came to Canada in 1906. He attended Mew Hall School in England at Burton on Trent, then became a farmer and livestock dealer by career.

Ferrie served in World War I under the 2nd Engineers as a corporal. For 20 years, he was also a reeve of Rural Municipality of Invermay No. 305.

He was first elected to Parliament at the Mackenzie riding in the 1949 general election by defeating Co-operative Commonwealth Federation incumbent Alexander Malcolm Nicholson. After completing his only term in the House of Commons, he was defeated by Nicholson in the 1953 election.

References

External links
 

1892 births
1955 deaths
Canadian farmers
Canadian military personnel of World War I
Liberal Party of Canada MPs
Members of the House of Commons of Canada from Saskatchewan
Politicians from Denver
Mayors of places in Saskatchewan
American emigrants to Canada